Knifefight is a hip hop duo consisting of rapper Beans and producer Mux Mool.

The six-track EP, Knifefight, was released on Anticon on September 3, 2013. It featured guest appearances from Cities Aviv, Kool A.D., and Sub Con. The EP was described by Blake Gillespie of Impose Magazine as "a danger funk that orchestrates a balance between their experimentation of Anti-Pop Consortium and the Ghostly vibes of Planet High School."

Discography
EPs
 Knifefight (2013)

References

External links
 
 

Alternative hip hop groups
American hip hop groups
American musical duos
Anticon
Musical groups established in 2013
2013 establishments in the United States